Walter Braunfels (19 December 1882 – 19 March 1954) was a German composer, pianist, and music educator.

Life

Walter Braunfels was born in Frankfurt. His first music teacher was his mother, the great-niece of the composer Louis Spohr. He continued his piano studies in Frankfurt at the Hoch Conservatory with James Kwast.

Braunfels studied law and economics at the university in Munich until after a performance of Richard Wagner's Tristan und Isolde he decided on music. He went to Vienna in 1902 to study with the pianist and teacher Theodor Leschetizky. He then returned to Munich to study composition with Felix Mottl and Ludwig Thuille. In February 1918 he was wounded at the front and in June 1918 on his return to Frankfurt converted from Protestantism to Catholicism, composing his Te Deum of 1920–21 "not as music for musicians but as a personal expression of faith".

He achieved early success with the melodious opera Die Vögel (The Birds, 1920), such that Adolf Hitler, not realising that Braunfels was half-Jewish, in 1923 invited Braunfels to write an anthem for the Nazi Party, which Braunfels "indignantly turned down".

Braunfels performed as a professional pianist for many years. In 1949 he played Beethoven's Diabelli Variations on a radio broadcast.} At his farewell concert as pianist on 19 January 1952, he played Bach's D major Toccata, Beethoven's piano sonata no. 32 op. 111 and the arrangement of the Organ Fantasy and Fugue in G minor by Liszt.

Braunfels was invited by Konrad Adenauer, then mayor of Cologne, to serve as the first director (and founder together with Hermann Abendroth) of the Cologne Academy of Music (Hochschule für Musik Köln) from 1925 to 1933, and again from 1945 to 1950. With the rise of the Nazis to power he was dismissed, and listed as being half-Jewish in the Nazi list of musicians composing what the regime called degenerate music. He retired from public life during the Hitler years but continued to compose. The war passed peacefully for Braunfels and his wife, though his three sons were conscripted into the Wehrmacht. After World War II, he returned to public life and on 12 October 1945 again became director, and in 1948 president, of the Cologne Academy of Music and further enhanced his reputation as a music educator with high ideals.

Work as composer
Walter Braunfels was well known as a composer between the two World Wars but fell into oblivion after his death. There is now something of a renaissance of interest in his works. His opera Die Vögel, based on the play The Birds by Aristophanes, was recorded by Decca in 1996 and has been successfully revived (for example, by the Los Angeles Opera in 2009). In 2014 Die Vögel was staged at Theater Osnabrück and Der Traum ein Leben at Oper Bonn.

Braunfels's music is in the German classical-romantic tradition. His Phantastische Erscheinungen eines Themas von Hector Berlioz is a giant set of variations. "Structurally the work has something in common with Strauss' Don Quixote—on LSD", noted David Hurwitz of ClassicsToday. "The orchestral technique also is quite similar, recognizably German school, with luscious writing for violins and horns, occasional outbursts of extreme virtuosity all around, and a discerning but minimal use of additional percussion."

Braunfels composed music in a number of different genres, not only operas, but also songs, choral works and orchestral, chamber and piano pieces.

Compositions

Operas
 Prinzessin Brambilla Op. 12 (after E. T. A. Hoffmann) (1909)
 Ulenspiegel (1913)
 Die Vögel Op. 30 (after Aristophanes) (1913–19)
 Don Gil von den grünen Hosen, Op. 35 (1924) – based on Tirso de Molina's Don Gil of the Green Breeches
 Der gläserne Berg, Op. 39 (1929) – a Christmas fairy tale
 Galathea, Op. 40 (1929) in 1 act
 Verkündigung, Op. 50 (after Paul Claudel) (composed 1933–35, premièred NWDR Television 1948)
 L'Annonce faite à Marie, reconstruction of the French version after Paul Claudel (2013, not premièred)
 Der Traum ein Leben, Op. 51 (1937)
 Szenen aus dem Leben der Heiligen Johanna, Op. 57 (1939–1943, premièred Stockholm 2001)
 Tanzspiel Der Zauberlehrling after the poem by Goethe, Op. 71 composed as a Ballade for television (1954). "In the television studios of Hamburg-Lokstedt there was the premiere of Der Zauberlehrling during February to music by Professor Walter Braunfels in charge of the NWDR Television."

Oratorios

 Offenbarung Johannis – Revelation of John Op. 17 (1919)
 Te Deum Op. 32 (1920–21)
 Große Messe, Op. 37 (1923–26)
 Passionskantate, Op. 54 (1936–43)
 Das Spiel von der Auferstehung des Herrn – Resurrection play, Op. 72 (1954) after the Alsfelder Passionsspiel, arranged by Hans Reinhart

Selected other works
 Variations on an Old French Children's Song, Op. 15 (1909)
 Ariels Gesang, Op. 18 (1910, after Shakespeare's The Tempest)
 Serenade, Op. 20 (1910)
 Piano Concerto, Op 21 (1912)
 Phantastiche Erscheinungen eines Themas von Hector Berlioz (Fantastic Appearances of a Theme by Hector Berlioz), Op. 25 (1914–17)
 Don Juan Variations for Orchestra, Op. 34 (1924)
 Prelude and Fugue for large orchestra, Op. 36 (1922–35)
 Organ Concerto, Op. 38 (1927)
 Two Choruses for Male Choir, Op. 41 (1925)
 Schottische Fantasie for Viola and Orchestra, Op. 47 (1933)
 Die Gott minnende Seele Song Cycle, Op. 53 (1936)
 The Death of Cleopatra, Op. 59 (1944) Scene for Soprano and Orchestra
 Music (Sinfonia Concertante) for Violin Solo, Viola Solo, 2 Horns and String Orchestra, Op. 68 (1948)
 Sinfonia brevis in F minor, Op. 69 (1948)
 Hebriden-Tänze for Piano & Orchestra, Op. 70 (1951)
 "Der Tod fürs Vaterland", ode by Friedrich Hölderlin, Op. 27 (1916–1918)

Chamber works and solo
 String Quartet No. 1 in A minor, Op. 60 (1944)
 String Quartet No. 2 in F Major, Op. 61 (1944)
 String Quintet in F sharp minor, Op. 63 (1944)
 String Quartet No. 3, Op. 67 (1947)

References

Sources

Further reading
 Jung-Kaiser, Ute. 1980. Walter Braunfels (1882–1954). Studien zur Musikgeschichte des 19. Jahrhunderts 58. Regensburg: Bosse.
 Tommasini, Anthony. 13 April 2009. "Even High Above Those Clouds, You Can Never Escape From the Gods". The New York Times (accessed 19 April 2009).

External links 

 
 
 "Walter Braunfels", short biography by Michael Custodis, Lexikon verfolgter Musiker und Musikerinnen der NS-Zeit (in German)
 "Silenced Voice, Heard Again" by Matthew Gurewitsch, The New York Times, 7 January 2011

1882 births
1954 deaths
German people of Jewish descent
Musicians from Frankfurt
People from Hesse-Nassau
German male classical composers
German Romantic composers
German opera composers
Male opera composers
Jewish classical composers
German classical pianists
German male pianists
Male classical pianists
Jewish classical pianists
Academic staff of the Hochschule für Musik und Tanz Köln
Hoch Conservatory alumni
19th-century German male musicians
20th-century German male musicians
20th-century German composers
20th-century classical composers
20th-century classical pianists